The Hotel Casa Santo Domingo is a noted 3 star hotel and museum in Antigua Guatemala, Guatemala. It is located in the grounds of the Santo Domingo Monastery. This monastery was partially destroyed in the Santa Marta earthquake.

The hotel opened in June 1989.

Gallery

Hotel

Museum artifacts

References

External links
Maya archaeology

Hotels in Guatemala
Buildings and structures in Antigua Guatemala
Museums in Guatemala
Hotels established in 1989
Historic house museums in South America